Jesús María Sanz-Serna (born 12 June 1953 in Valladolid, Spain) is a mathematician who specializes in applied mathematics. Sanz-Serna pioneered the field of geometric integration and wrote the first book on this subject.  From 1998 to 2006, he was rector of the University of Valladolid.

He received the inaugural Dahlquist Prize from the Society for Industrial and Applied Mathematics in 1995 and became one of the inaugural fellows of the American Mathematical Society in 2012. His 60th birthday was celebrated at the 2013 International Conference on Scientific Computation and Differential Equations (SciCADE) in Valladolid.

Notes

Numerical analysts
1953 births
Living people
Fellows of the American Mathematical Society